The thorny round stingray (Urotrygon chilensis), also known as the Chilean or blotched stingray, is a species of fish in the family Urotrygonidae. It is found in Chile, Colombia, Costa Rica, Ecuador, El Salvador, Guatemala, Honduras, Mexico, Nicaragua, Panama and Peru. Its natural habitat is open seas.

References

Chilean round ray
Fish of Mexican Pacific coast
Fish of Central America
Fish of Chile
Fish of Colombia
Fish of Ecuador
Fish of Peru
Western American coastal fauna
Chilean round ray
Taxa named by Albert Günther
Taxonomy articles created by Polbot